Phocides belus, the beautiful beamer or Belus skipper, is a skipper in the family Hesperiidae. It is found from Mexico to Costa Rica. Strays have been reported as far north as Texas.

The wings have a powder-blue hue.

Last instar larvae reach a length of 38 mm. They are mostly uniform white with a light brown head capsule. They feed on Thouinidium decandrum.

References

External links 
 Photos of live adult specimens
 Photos of live larvae and pupa

Eudaminae
Butterflies described in 1890
Hesperiidae of South America
Butterflies of North America
Taxa named by Frederick DuCane Godman
Taxa named by Osbert Salvin